Red Level is an unincorporated community in Montgomery County, Alabama, United States.

Notes

Unincorporated communities in Montgomery County, Alabama
Unincorporated communities in Alabama